German Molina Moreno (October 4, 1933 – January 8, 2016), also known as Kuya Germs ( or ) and dubbed as "The Master Showman", was a Filipino television host, presenter, actor, comedian, talent manager, producer, writer, and director.

Early life
Moreno was born to Jose Moreno y Calvo (Pepe), a Spanish Filipino mestizo, and Aurora Molina, a Filipina. He had one sister, Pilar Moreno Nite. His father died after an incident involving an American soldier. Moreno first worked for an aunt's taxi company and also sold bibingka, peanuts, and cigarettes. He also became a jeepney barker.

Career

Early career
Moreno became involved in the entertainment industry working as a janitor and telonero (curtain raiser) of Clover Theater in 1957. His first break was a role as Jesus Christ for the Manila Grand Opera House. He later went on to pursue a career as a comedian of the bodabil stage and the post-war screen.

Later career
In 1963, Moreno took his comedy act to Sampaguita Pictures, the home of biggest stars at that time such as Dolphy, Panchito, Gloria Romero, and Susan Roces. He hosted a premiere night at the Life Theater but refused Nene Vera-Perez's attempt to pay him and instead asked for movie roles instead. Moreno then had roles in the movies Dance-O-Rama, Mga Batang Iskwater, Class Reunion, and Mga Batang Bakasyunista. It was in his Sampaguita stint where he met his longtime co-host Ike Lozada.

Moreno also became a disc jockey as Eddie Ilarde's sidekick in the radio program Ngayon Naman on CBN. In 1969, he transferred radio stations to DZTR as a pinch-hitter for Helen Vela, Bingo Lacson, and Ben David. Moreno would then be given his own timeslot from 11 pm to 12 mn for Bisita Artista, Music Factory, and Guy and Pip Song Festival. In the last decades of his life, he hosted his own hour-long show on DZBB during weekdays at 2:30 pm.

Moreno's biggest break came on television in the late 1970s when he became host of the Sunday noontime variety show, GMA Supershow (first known as Germside and Germspesyal). He eventually became the host, star builder, and producer of That's Entertainment, a youth-oriented variety show developing the biggest stars in the Philippines. He gave out gift packs from sponsors to every guest of his programs. He was the host of a late-night show Walang Tulugan with the Master Showman. He also co-hosted Superstar with Jograd de La Torre. Superstar was the Sunday musical-variety show of Moreno's close friend Nora Aunor.

Moreno also produced TV films such as Kung Mayroon Mang Pangarap, Ganti, Sa Paglinaw Ng Tubig, Ikaw, Ako at Ang Awit, Dalawang Ina, Dalawang Pag-ibig, Larawan ng Isang Ina, and Ina.

He founded the Eastwood City Walk of Fame in Quezon City, on December 1, 2005. It is patterned after the Hollywood Walk of Fame in Hollywood, California.

Since 1996, FAMAS had given out out the Youth Achievement Award, named after him. The German Moreno Youth Achievement Award is given to a batch of young stars that have exemplar performances in the motion picture industry. The Philippine Movie Press Club also named after Moreno the German Moreno Power Tandem Award, awarded to popular love teams on television.

He was also the former president of Katipunan ng mga Artistang Pilipino sa Pelikula at Telebisyon (KAPPT). He also endorsed prominent brands such as Vaseline Shampoo and Dazz Dishwashing Paste.

In April 2013, Moreno celebrated his 50th anniversary in the Philippine entertainment industry with a tribute special entitled 50 Years With The Master Showman at the Newport Performing Arts Theater in Resorts World Manila, Pasay. The special was attended by Moreno's "anak-anakan" (his discoveries) throughout his five decades in showbiz.

On March 24, 2014, Moreno established the GMA Network's Walk of Fame, outside the GMA Network Center, with over 196 celebrities and news & public affairs personalities received the plaque.

In his final months, Moreno was the creative consultant of Sunday PinaSaya. He has a special chair in front of the stage, where he was sitting along with the studio audience to view the program. He celebrated his last birthday on October 4, 2015. Despite being in wheelchair, he attended in GMA Network's 2016 New Year countdown special at SM Mall Of Asia marking his last public appearance, and was last heard at Walang Siyesta on January 6, 2016.

Personal life
Moreno had an adopted son named Federico Moreno. His grandson Luis Moreno is an archer. His nephew John Nite is also a TV host on Walang Tulugan with the Master Showman.

Political views
Moreno was a supporter of former President Ferdinand Marcos, even after he was deposed from the presidency by the People Power Revolution in 1986; during a September 1988 episode of his musical program GMA Supershow, he and his co-hosts sang a medley of songs dedicated to Marcos to commemorate his birthday.

Health and death
Moreno suffered a mild stroke on January 2, 2015. His condition improved soon after, according to his son Federico Moreno. Few months later, he returned to his programs Walang Siyesta! and Walang Tulugan with the Master Showman.

One year later, he was rushed into St. Luke's Medical Center at Quezon City in the evening of January 7, 2016 and fell into a coma. Moreno died on January 8, 2016, at 3:20 am from cardiac arrest, according to his nephew John Nite. He was 82 years old. Later that evening, his remains arrived at Our Lady of Mt. Carmel Shrine. The next day, his show Walang Tulugan with the Master Showman was aired as a live tribute, took place in his wake. He was buried in Loyola Memorial Park in Marikina after being brought to GMA Network Center.

Walang Tulugan with the Master Showman concluded on February 13, 2016, a month after his death.

Legacy and tribute

A special tribute concert entitled The Master Showman's Final Bow was aired on February 26, 2016, where the comedy show Bubble Gang was preempted to give way for the TV special. His son Federico announced the establishment of German Moreno Foundation, an organization made by Moreno's loved ones and friends. It will continue his support for Mowelfund, and honor stars through the Eastwood City Walk of Fame.

The German Moreno Power Tandem Award (launched in 2014) still continues up to the present day.

At the GMA Network Studio Annex in Quezon City, The German Moreno Studio (formerly known as Studio 6) was inaugurated in honor of his legacy and in tribute to his 85th birthday on October 4, 2018, with families, relatives, friends and the staff of GMA paying tribute. It currently houses the daily noontime variety game show TiktoClock.

Filmography

Film

Television

Radio
DZTR Music Factory (1970s)
Balitang Artista (DZBB) (1989–1997)
Master Showman sa Dobol B (Walang Siyesta!) (1997–2016)

Awards
Winner, Best Supporting Actor for "Paupahan" - 2009 FAMAS Awards
Winner, Ading Fernando Lifetime Achievement Award - PMPC Star Awards for TV (1993)
Winner, Best Variety Show Host - PMPC Star Awards for TV (1988, 1991, 1993 & 1994)
Winner, Special Citation Award - PMPC Star Awards for TV (2013)
Winner, Best Supporting Actor - PMPC Star Awards for Movies (2009)
Posthumous Award Winner for Entertainment Excellence & Star Builder - GMMSF Box-Office Entertainment Awards (2016)

References

External links

1933 births
2016 deaths
20th-century Filipino male actors
21st-century Filipino male actors
Burials at the Loyola Memorial Park
Filipino male comedians
Filipino male television actors
Filipino television talk show hosts
Filipino television variety show hosts
Filipino people of Spanish descent
Radio Philippines Network personalities
GMA Network personalities
GMA Network (company) people
Male actors from Manila
People from Santa Cruz, Manila
That's Entertainment (Philippine TV series)
Filipino male film actors
Filipino male stage actors